The 1925–26 Marquette Blue and Gold men's ice hockey season was the 4th season of play for the program.

Season
Marquette team continued to suffer from the effects of warm weather and were unable to practice much throughout the season. When the team opened the season against Wisconsin, the Badgers challenged Gordon Thomas's eligibility, saying that he had already used up his three years of eligibility. The captain was able to get in the second game, strengthening the team, but it didn't change the outcome and Marquette was swept in their opening weekend.

The team played their first home game in nearly two years when they took on defending western champion Minnesota. The Blue and Gold demonstrated a great deal of improvement with a 0–0 tie I the first game. The Gophers couldn't be contained, however, and ended up winning the next game 4–1 with captain Thomas scoring Marquette's first goal of the season. The Blue and Gold were finally able to get a decent number of goals in the game against Notre Dame but, as the rest of their season went, the team still couldn't win a game.

An additional difficulty the team had was the lack of a full-time coach. Art Schinner provided some guidance, but the team was mostly run by the players themselves. With only two returning for the following season, the team had its work cut out for it.

Ted Wedemeyer served as team manager with Edward Barrett as an assistant.

Roster

Standings

Schedule and results

|-
!colspan=12 style=";" | Regular Season

† Marquette record indicate the final three games of their season happened in late-March, early-April, however, Notre Dame's records indicate otherwise. Due to the reported warm winter, it's likely that Notre Dame's archive is accurate.

References

Marquette Golden Eagles men's ice hockey seasons
Marquette
Marquette
Marquette
Marquette